The blacksaddle filefish, Paraluteres prionurus, is a filefish of the family Monacanthidae.  It reaches a length of a maximum 11 cm.

The blacksaddle filefish are found in pairs or in small schools and inhabit reefs across the Indian and Pacific oceans.

Coloration is sandy to grey with distinctive black "saddles" on the back and a yellow tail.

The blacksaddle filefish has evolved to mimic Canthigaster valentini, a highly poisonous pufferfish commonly found where ever P. prionurus is found. The two species have been known to school together.

Gallery

References

External links
 

Monacanthidae
Fish described in 1851
Taxa named by Pieter Bleeker